The Victoria Medal is an award presented by the Royal Geographical Society. It is awarded "for conspicuous merit in research in geography" and has been given since 1902, in honour of the late Queen Victoria. Up until then, the society's Patron's Medal had alternatively been known as the "Victoria Medal", and the new medal resembled its original design.

Past recipients 

Recipients include:

1902: Ernst Georg Ravenstein, for his efforts during 40 years to introduce scientific methods into the cartography of the United Kingdom
1903: Sven Hedin, for his exploration in Central Asia
1905: John George Bartholomew, for his efforts to raise the standard of cartography.
1906: W. M. Ramsay, for his investigation of the Ancient Geography of Asia Minor
1909: Alexander Agassiz, for thirty years' work in oceanographical exploration
1911: Henry George Lyons, Egyptian Survey. For his investigations of the River Nile and its basin
1912: George H. Darwin, for his investigations on tides and in geodesy.
1913: Sidney Gerald Burrard Indian Survey. For his distinguished contributions to geography and geodesy.
1915: Hugh Robert Mill
1917: John Keltie
1919: John Walter Gregory
1920: Harold St. John Loyd Winterbotham
1922: John F. Baddeley
1924: John Fillmore Hayford
1927: Charles Close
1928: Edward Ayearst Reeves
1930: Emmanuel de Margerie
1932: Arthur Philemon Coleman
1934: Edward Heawood
1935: Edward James Wayland
1936: Stanley Wells Kemp
1938: Arthur Robert Hinks
1940: O. G. S. Crawford
1941: Harold Jeffreys
1946: Herbert John Fleure, for distinguished service in the advancement of geographical education and valuable researches into the human aspects of geography
1947: Eva G. R. Taylor
1948: Frank Debenham
1950: Emmanuel de Martonne
1951: Charles Cotton
1953: John Myres
1955: Sir John Russell, for his studies of soils and agriculture
1957: Sidney William Wooldridge
1958: Roberto Almagià
1959: Gerald Seligman
1960: James Alfred Steers
1962: Carl Troll
1963: Henry Clifford Darby
1964: John Norman Leonard Baker
1966: Gerald Roe Crone
1967: Charles W. Phillips
1968: Walter Christaller
1969: Marcel Aurousseau
1970: Raleigh Ashlin Skelton
1971: Oskar Spate
1972: George Henry John Daysh
1973: Emyr Estyn Evans
1974: Charles Alfred Fisher
1975: Carl O. Sauer
1976: Joseph Newell Jennings
1977: Emrys Jones
1978: Terence Armstrong
1979: Torsten Hägerstrand
1980: Jean Gottmann
1981: Julius Büdel
1982: Helmut J. Jusatz
1983: Bertram Hughes Farmer
1984: Richard Hartshorne
1985: John Terence Coppock
1986: Ren Mei'e
1987: Chauncy Harris
1988: Brian Berry
1989: David Simonett
1990: Ron Johnston
1991: John Clarke
1992: John Goddard
1993: Norman Graves
1994: Doreen Massey
1995: Helen Wallis
1996: Ronald Abler, for his contribution to human geography and enhancement of links between British and American geography
1997: David Lowenthal
1998: Ian Simmons
1999: Robin Butlin
2000: Desmond Walling
2001: Peter Dicken
2002: Angela Gurnell
2003: Nigel Thrift
2004: Michael Watts, for research on political economy, culture and power
2005: Ray Hudson, for research on regional and industrial change in the UK and wider Europe
2006: Jim Rose, for contributions to quaternary research
2007: Peter Jackson, for research on social geography
2008: Linda McDowell, for research in socio-economic and feminist geography
2009: Philip Rees, for research on population geography and demography
2010: Rick Battarbee, for research in environmental change
2011: John Lowe, for research in Quaternary Science.
2012: Stuart N. Lane, for research in physical geography and hydrological modelling.
2013: Paul A. Longley, for research in geographic information science.
2014: Susan Jane Smith, for research on geography
2015: Stephen Daniels, for research excellence in cultural geography
2016: Ron Martin, for research excellence in regional economic development
2017: Andrew Cliff, "for research excellence in spatial epidemiology"
2018: Wendy Larner, "for internationally leading research on globalisation and political economy"
 2019: David Thomas, "for world leading research into dryland environments and societies"
 2022 Paul Cloke Rural geography

See also

 List of geography awards

References
Royal Geographical Society's page of links to lists of past recipients.

Awards of Royal Geographical Society
Awards established in 1902